A nest is a place animals live or raise offspring.

Nest may also refer to:

 Bird nests in particular

Places
 Nest Lake, a lake in Minnesota, US
 Nest Island, an island in Nunavut, Canada

People
 Nest ferch Cadell, mother of Rhodri the Great, King of Wales
 Nest ferch Rhys, daughter of the last King of South Wales
 Nest, daughter of Gruffudd ap Llywelyn and Ealdgyth, daughter of Earl Ælfgar

Entertainment
 Nest Family Entertainment, an animation studio
 Nest (album), a music album by the Odds
 Nest (band), a Finnish band
 NEST, a fictional organization in the film Transformers: Revenge of the Fallen
 NESTS, a fictional organization from The King of Fighters
 Nest (magazine), a magazine published from 1997 to 2004
 Nest, a 2022 short film directed by Hlynur Pálmason

Organizations
 Google Nest (formerly Nest Labs), an American manufacturer of smart home products
 Near East School of Theology
 Nepalese Society in Trondheim (NeST)
 Northland Emergency Services Trust
 Nuclear Emergency Support Team

Science and technology
 Nest (protein structural motif)
 Nest algebra, a mathematical concept
 NEST (software), a simulation software for neuronal networks
 Google Nest. a smart home control system (and its derivatives)
 Nest (histopathology), a microscopic pattern of cells

Other
 National Employment Savings Trust, the UK's default workplace pension scheme
 National Entrance Screening Test, an entrance exam in India
 Nest Learning Thermostat, an electronic, programmable, and self-learning Wi-Fi-enabled thermostat
 Nest (horse), an American thoroughbred horse

See also
 NEST+m, New Explorations into Science, Technology, and Math School
 Nesting (disambiguation)
 Nestling
 Nested
 The Nest (disambiguation)
 NEST (disambiguation)